Cuarón is a Spanish surname. People with this name include:

Alfonso Cuarón (born 1961), Mexican film director, screenwriter, producer, and editor
Alicia Cuarón (born 1939), Mexican-American educator and human rights activist
Carlos Cuarón (born 1966), Mexican screenwriter, brother of Alfonso Cuarón
Jonás Cuarón (born 1981), Mexican film director, son of Alfonso Cuarón
Ralph Cuarón (1923–2002), Chicano communist organizer and leader 

Surnames of Spanish origin